The Shanti Swarup Bhatnagar Prize for Science and Technology (SSB) is a science award in India given annually by the Council of Scientific and Industrial Research (CSIR) for notable and outstanding research, applied or fundamental, in biology, chemistry, environmental science, engineering, mathematics, medicine, and physics. The prize recognizes outstanding Indian work (according to the view of CSIR awarding committee) in science and technology. It is the most coveted award in multidisciplinary science in India. The award is named after the founder Director of the Council of Scientific & Industrial Research, Shanti Swarup Bhatnagar. It was first awarded in 1958.

Any citizen of India engaged in research in any field of science and technology up to the age of 45 years is eligible for the prize. The prize is awarded on the basis of contributions made through work done in India only during the five years preceding the year of the prize. In addition, recipients also receive Rs. 15,000 per month up to the age of 65 years.

Nomination and selection 

Names of candidates are proposed by a member of the governing body of CSIR, Vice-Chancellors of universities or institutes of national importance, and deans of different faculties of science and former awardees. Selection is made by the Advisory Committee constituted each year and necessarily consists of at least six experts including at least one former Bhatnagar Awardee in the respective discipline. At least 2/3 agreement of the members is required for selection. If two nominees are unanimously recommended in the same field because of equal merit, both are awarded.

Prizes 
The prize is divided into seven disciplines, namely:
 Biological Sciences
 Chemical Sciences
 Earth, Atmosphere, Ocean and Planetary Sciences
 Engineering Sciences
 Mathematical Sciences
 Medical Sciences
 Physical Sciences.

Each discipline can have multiple winners (maximum 2 individuals).

Recipients 
 List of Shanti Swarup Bhatnagar Prize recipients

Presentation

The names of the recipients are traditionally declared by the Director General on every 26 September, which is the CSIR Foundation Day. The prize is distributed by the Prime Minister of India. The awardee is bound to give a lecture in the area of the award, generally outside his/her city of work.

See also 

 List of general science and technology awards

References

External links 

 
 Full list of Awardees – Official website
 Council of Scientific and Industrial Research

Indian awards
Civil awards and decorations of India
 
Council of Scientific and Industrial Research
Indian science and technology awards
Lifetime achievement awards
Recipients of the Shanti Swarup Bhatnagar Award in Mathematical Science
Recipients of the Shanti Swarup Bhatnagar Award in Biological Science
Recipients of the Shanti Swarup Bhatnagar Award in Earth, Atmosphere, Ocean & Planetary Sciences
Recipients of the Shanti Swarup Bhatnagar Award in Engineering Science
Recipients of the Shanti Swarup Bhatnagar Award in Medical Science
1958 establishments in India
Awards established in 1958